Poolakutty is a town near Peravoor in Kannur District of Kerala state in India.

Peravoor is just 5 km away from Poolakutty. Many roads connect with Peravoor. The four roads meeting at the city's central junction proceed to Wayanad, Peravoor / Thalassery, Kolakkad / Kelakam / Kottiyoor and Vellara, respectively.

Poolakutty-Wayand road was being used by Pazhassi Raja, Tippu Sulthan and British rulers to connect with Thalassery and Wayand.

Culture 
Most of the people are Syrian Christians migrated during the Malabar Migration. There are also many Hindus.

Rubber plantations are the major agriculture in this area. Other varieties of agriculture include Coconut tree plantation, Cashew plantation, black pepper plantation, and coffee plantation.

Institutions 
 Vijaya Bank, Bank of India, Poolakutty Co-Operative Bank
 Milma Office
 Post Office
 BSNL Telephone Exchange
 Government Homeopathic Hospital
 Gov veterinary clinic
 Gov Health Office
 Gov Nursery
 Aided School
 Saint Mary's Catholic Church
 St. Mary's Auditorium
 Navabodhi Library
 Navatharangini Music Club
 ASMI Convent
 Lumia Media Networks

Places nearby
 Thalassery-41 km
 Kannur-54 km
 Wayand District-10 km
 Iritty-20 km
 Peravoor-7 km
 Elapeedika-6 km
 Kannur International Airport-32 km
 Coorg-60 km

References

 Villages in Kannur district